Brooks v Canada Safeway Ltd [1989] 1 S.C.R. 1219 is a leading Supreme Court of Canada decision on employer discrimination of pregnant employees. The court found that Safeway violated the provincial Human Rights Act by failing to provide equal compensation for those who missed work due to pregnancy. This decision overturned the controversial case of Bliss v. Attorney General of Canada, [1979].

In 1982, Susan Brooks, Patricia Allen, and Patricia Dixon were all part-time cashiers at Safeway who became pregnant. The Safeway insurance plan that provided benefits for loss of pay due to accident or sickness did not give full benefits for 17 weeks for those who were unable to work due to pregnancy. The three women brought claims against Safeway for discriminating on the basis of pregnancy for discrimination based on sex. The court held unanimously that the insurance policy was discriminating against pregnant women.

See also
 Canadian labour law
 List of Supreme Court of Canada cases

External links
 

Canadian civil rights case law
Supreme Court of Canada cases
Legal issues in pregnancy
Canadian labour case law
Safeway Inc.
1989 in Canadian case law
Anti-discrimination law in Canada
Gender discrimination lawsuits
Women's rights in Canada
Manitoba case law